The Men competition at the 2017 World Championships was held on 24 and 26 February 2017.

Results
The first two runs were held on 24 February 2017 and the last two runs on 26 February 2017.

References

Men